Camp Morrison may refer to:
 Camp Morrison, Virginia, a World War I Army post at Morrison, Virginia
 Camp Morrison, Idaho, a Boy Scout camp in McCall, Idaho